Oleg Terentiyovych Minko (Ukrainian: Олéг Терéнтійович Мінькó; August 3, 1938 – November 20, 2013) was a Ukrainian painter and art teacher, belonging to the Lviv school of artistic expression. He was awarded the rank of 'Honoured Artist Of Ukraine' by the state and was considered to be one of the most established and rated artists in the country.

Biography 

Minko was born in Makiivka, Donetsk Oblast, Ukrainian SSR. During World War II, Minko's family moved to the Nosachi village in Cherkassy Oblast, where Minko's father came from. In 1944, they returned to Makiivka. His mother Antonina Andriivna worked as an accountant in the "Makiivbud" trust. His father Terentiy Ivanovych was an economist in the machine shop at the Makiivka Metallurgical Plant. After school, Oleg graduated from the Makiivka metallurgical technical training school. From early childhood Oleg loved to draw and dreamed of becoming a painter. According to the family history, Oleg's great grandfather was an icon painter.

In 1959, Oleg Minko enrolled into the Department of artistic weaving at the Lviv State Institute of Applied and Decorative Arts (now Lviv National Academy of Arts). His professors were the painters Roman Selskyi and Carlo Zvirynskyi.

After graduating from the Institute in 1965, he worked as a weaving shop foreman in the Lviv Art-Production Enterprise and within five years became the head of that shop. From 1971 to 1982, he worked as a painter of the monumental shop of the Lviv Art-Production Enterprise. Since 1982 Oleg Minko has worked as senior professor of the sub department of artistic tapestry at the Lviv State Institute of Applied and Decorative Arts. He was the head of that sub-department until his death in 2013.
 
Minko has been married since 1959. His spouse Olha Minko was in the past a talented weaver. His daughter Iryna Minko-Muraschyk is a recognized artist (pastels and small format tapestry).

On November 20, 2013 Oleg Minko died in Lviv.

Artwork 

Minko's early works took the form of abstract painting, expressing his internal experiences with minimum means. One of the first abstract compositions "Gra v karty" (The Card Play) was painted in 1961. Abstraction (1963–1965) gave Minko complete freedom in his searches for the unknown. Works "Zamkova sparynka" (The Keyhole), "Chorna maska" (The Black Mask), "Pechera" (The Cave), "Chorni pryamokutnyky" (The Black Rectangles), "Misiachne siayvo" (The Moonlight), "Kompozytsia z priamokutnykiv" (The Composition Of Rectangles) are precisely measured works with a severe and ascetic feel to them. The colour range in these works consists of dark, noble colours: blacks, greys, browns, deep blues and bronzes. Minko's abstract painting stage continued until 1965. He then started looking for a new way of expressing  his emotions, leading him down the path to a new style of painting which the artist out of convenience calls figurative painting.
	 
From 1967 to 1969, he created a series of works entitled "Zhyttia masok" (The Life of Masks). During this period, historical and social subjects became the main focus of his creative research. He experimented with the human figure within the pictorial space of his paintings and through the use of symbolism tried to express his outrage at what he perceived was wrong in, the then, communist society. Through this approach, between 1968 and 1972, he was to create a new series of philosophically pertinent and metaphorically loaded works: "Nostalhiya" (Nostalgia), "Bil"(The Pain), "Lyudyna z yablukom (Illuzionist)" (The Man with an apple (The Illusionist), "Kryk" (The Scream), "Bezgluzdia"(Nonsense).  These paintings – were the frank reaction of the artist to the reinforced pressure of the totalitarian government.

In 1970, Minko became a member of the Painters' Association.
          
During that period, his work took on a new emphasis on historical subjects. Paintings praised Cossack times, mourned fallen heroes: "Kosak", "Smert koshovogo" (The Chieftain's Death), "Stepom" (By Step), "Poema pro davniy step" (The Tale of the Old Step). These pieces clearly show the artist's preoccupation with things uniquely Ukrainian, national and traditional, understanding of history and glorious Cossack times, pain for Ukraine's fate, prophesies on the future and concern for the present. Later, after his creative crisis that lasted for almost eight years was over, these series of works would get a continuation: "Trypillya", "Banduryst", "Kniaz Sviatoslav", "Pamyat dida" (The Grandfather Memory), "Prorok" (The Prophet). Particularly striking is the canvas "Smert koshovogo" (The Chieftain's Death) which is part of the Lviv Art Gallery's collection.

Approximately from 1970 until 1978, the artist lived through a prolonged creative depression which he himself referred to as his "period of silence", triggered by long-lasting psychological stress, in turn aggravated after his friends' arrests, being tracked, being constantly called in for interrogation by the KGB, secretly prohibited from exhibiting his works and general aggravation of the situation within the totalitarian society.

1978 signalled a new creative period in his life, undergoing a kind of rebirth and unique catharsis. A breakthrough which began a new exhibiting phase in the artist's biography.

In 1981 an exhibition of three famous Lviv painters Oleg Minko, Zenoviy Flinta and Lyubomyr Medvid took place at the Lviv Picture Gallery. "The Exhibition of three" ("Vystavka triokh") – under this name it would enter art history – described as a bright event, "a sip of pure spring water" in the artistic environment. 
  	 
After the success of this exhibition (not only in  Lviv, but also in Kyiv, Vilnius and Moscow) Oleg Minko, Zenoviy Flinta and Lyubomyr Medvid were awarded the rank of "Honoured Artists of Ukraine".

Periods of artwork 

The artist's work can be divided into three phases:

First period 

Considered by the art critics the most powerful, it spanned from 1960 to 1972. The series of abstract works under the general name "Compositions" and the series "Life of the Masks" were, even back then, an affirmation of the emergence of an original artist who tried to escape the jaws of socialism. Oleg Minko himself reckons "Compositions" and "Life of the Masks" to be the turning point to his artwork.

Between 1970 and 1978, he underwent the creative crisis which he refers to as the "period of silence".

Second period 

One of "romantic realism", when the artist, according to his own words, was relearning how to paint: he worked on a series of landscapes and portraits. Artistic images were lyrically constructed by his romantically-philosophical outlook. This phase in the artists' work has its genesis with the painting "The Daughter's Portrait" completed in 1980. This work truly ushered in the romantically-realistic period that was to last until the late 1980s.

Third period 

A "returning to the origins" – started in the late 1980s – early 1990s, when the artist was finally able to speak out in his mature artistic style, drawing on his unique world outlook, internal experiences and visual language. In 1989 he created a powerful series in the subjective-figurative style. Such works as:  "Perestoroga" (The Warning), "Staryi z palytseiu" (The Old Man with a Cane) and "Vidchay" (Despair) amongst others.

Latest artwork 

Keeping to his individual artistic tradition, from the late 1980s and into the early 1990s he brings new elements and unique formal solutions to his works, creating an original world where his characters exist in the past, present and future simultaneously or – in parallel dimensions. 
 
The key element in Oleg Minko's art work through the years is the image of Man and his fate. He raises philosophical questions of birth, meaning of life, our role in the universe. "Bil" (Pain), "Nostalgiya" (Nostalgy),  "Muky" (Passions), "Pokayannya" (Repentance), "Dvi postati" (Two Figures), "Zemnni muky" (Earthly Passions), "Bila postat" (The White Figure), "Odkrovennya" (Revelation), "Liudyna I yahnia" (The Human and  the Sheep), "Khymery" (The Chimeras), "Divchyna z ptakhom" (The Girl with a Bird), "Vershnyk" (The Rider), "Cholovik u krisli" (The Man in a Chair) – in these and other works we find not so much joy of life but more of its drama and tragedy,  emphasized by the use of a darker palette of colours and shades.
    
Frequently on his canvases one comes across a mysterious white figure. This figure is typical of his expressionist explorations: "Postat i bili kaly" (The Figure and White Calla Lilies), "Ogolena v lisi" (The Nude in the Forest), "Bila postat" (The White Figure), "Snig u lisi" (Snow in the Woods)… These deformed female or sometimes androgynous figures can symbolize women, fate, Ukraine and even death.
 
In 1995 he painted a series of works. "Kit i piven" (The Cat and the Rooster) as well as "Synia golova" (The Blue Head), "Naliakanyy kin" (The Scared Hoarse), a more expressionistic "Zhinochyi portret z babkoyu" (The Female Portrait with a Damselfly), "Ptashynyi spiv" (Bird Singing), "Portret iz zelenym lystkom" (Portrait with a Green Leave), "Tryvoga" (The Anxiety), "Zhinka, yaka yde po ozeru" (The Woman Walking the Lake), "Rozmova" (The Talk), "Mandruyuchi" (The Wandering), "Velyki hmary nad ozerom" (The Big Clouds over the Lake), "Metelyk na pliazhi" (The Butterfly on the Beach), "Piven" (The Rooster), "Divchyna z ptahom" (The Girl with a Bird) – these paintings speak of reality and mysticism, attempts to sink into the mystery of the ulterior world, bizarre life situations – a Ukrainian metaphysical world created by him.
  
In 2000, in the textbook for high school students Osnovy estetyky (The Essentials of Aesthetics) published in Kyiv, the name of this Ukrainian postmodernist artist took its place next to expressionists such as the Norwegian Edvard Munch, French artist Georges Rouault, Austrian expressionist Arnulf Rainer and the surrealists – the French Jules Breton, the Spanish Salvador Dalí and the Belgian René Magritte. "It's worthwhile mentioning that an expressionist world outlook has always been an inherent quality of the Ukrainian national consciousness. In particular, works of the Lviv artist Oleg Minko "Vidchay" (The Despair), "Movchannia" (The Silence), "Perestoroga" (The Warning) – are a new step in the development of the "Slavic branch of European expressionism" – the authors L. Levchuk and O. Onyshenko state in their book.

2009 – 50 years worth of artworks – for Oleg Minko this year was one of retrospection on the work accomplished, even though the artist continued to efficiently work as a painter and a professor. He recently started working on a new series "Znykli tsyvilizazii" (The Lost Civilizations), in which one can sense the motifs behind the artist's existential emotions towards the future of humanity.

References

External links 
Олег Мінько.Розмова перша. // Галерея "Дзига" Oleg Minko. First talk. Dzyga Gallery, Lviv (ukr).
Олег Мінько: митець мусить бути зі своїм народом. // Радіо Свобода Oleg Minko: an artist has to be with his people. Radio Liberty  (ukr).
Образ і Контекст.//Іван Андрусяк // Українська літературна газета Image and Context. Ukrainian Literature Gazette (ukr).

1938 births
2013 deaths
People from Makiivka
20th-century Ukrainian painters
20th-century Ukrainian male artists
21st-century Ukrainian painters
21st-century Ukrainian male artists
Modern painters
Ukrainian male painters